Company of Strangers  were a short-lived rock, pop music studio project formed by Simon Hussey in late 1991. The album featured performances by Daryl Braithwaite (ex-Sherbet) on vocals, Simon Hussey (ex-Cats Under Pressure, Australian Crawl) on keyboards, drums, engineering and production, Jef Scott on guitar and vocals, and James Reyne (ex-Australian Crawl) on vocals and guitar. Their debut self-titled album appeared in December 1992 via Sony Music Australia with Hussey producing. It peaked at No. 9 on the ARIA Albums Chart and was certified gold in 1993 for shipment of 35000 copies.

They released four singles, "Motor City (I Get Lost)" (July 1992), "Sweet Love" (November 1992), "Daddy's Gonna Make You a Star" (January 1993) and their cover version of the Beatles' "Baby, You're a Rich Man" (June 1993). Both "Motor City" and "Sweet Love" reached the ARIA Singles Chart top 30. At the ARIA Music Awards of 1993 Hussey won Producer of the Year for "Sweet Love", "Motor City" and "Daddy's Gonna Make You a Star"; and for "Nothing to Lose" for Braithwaite. Company of Strangers was also nominated for Breakthrough Artist - Album and "Motor City" was nominated for Breakthrough Artist – Single.

Discography

Studio albums

Singles

Awards and nominations

ARIA Music Awards
The ARIA Music Awards is an annual awards ceremony that recognises excellence, innovation, and achievement across all genres of Australian music. They commenced in 1987.

! 
|-
| rowspan="3"|1993
| Company of Strangers
| ARIA Award for Breakthrough Artist - Album
| 
| rowspan="3"|
|-
| "Motor City (I Get Lost)"
| ARIA Award for Breakthrough Artist - Single
| 
|-
| Simon Hussey for "Daddy's Gonna Make You a Star", "Motor City (I Get Lost)" and "Sweet Love"
| ARIA Award for Producer of the Year
| 
|-

References

Australian pop music groups
Australian supergroups
Musical groups disestablished in 1993
Musical groups established in 1992
Rock music supergroups